Jacint Verdaguer is an underground station of Serveis Ferroviaris de Mallorca (SFM) and Palma Metro in Palma on the island of Majorca, Spain. The station is located under Jacint Verdaguer Street between Jaume Balmes Street and Plaça de Santa Elisabet.

There are two island platforms, one for each service.

References

Palma Metro stations